The men's competition in +105 kg division was staged on September 25–26, 2007.

Schedule

Medalists

Records

Results

References
Results 

Men's 105